Lidgerwood is a city in Richland County, North Dakota, United States. The population was 600 at the 2020 census. Lidgerwood was founded in 1886. It is part of the Wahpeton, ND–MN Micropolitan Statistical Area.

Geography
Lidgerwood is located at  (46.074812, -97.149666).

Demographics

2010 census
As of the census of 2010, there were 652 people, 335 households, and 160 families residing in the city. The racial makeup of the city was 97.5% White, 2.0% Native American, and 0.5% from two or more races. Hispanic or Latino of any race were 0.9% of the population.

There were 335 households, of which 17.6% had children under the age of 18 living with them, 39.4% were married couples living together, 6.9% had a female householder with no husband present, 1.5% had a male householder with no wife present, and 52.2% were non-families. 46.0% of all households were made up of individuals, and 28.4% had someone living alone who was 65 years of age or older. The average household size was 1.95 and the average family size was 2.78.

The median age in the city was 51.3 years. 19% of residents were under the age of 18; 4.2% were between the ages of 18 and 24; 16.6% were from 25 to 44; 27.6% were from 45 to 64; and 32.5% were 65 years of age or older. The gender makeup of the city was 47.4% male and 52.6% female.

2000 census
As of the census of 2000, there were 738 people, 345 households, and 207 families residing in the city. The racial makeup of the city was 97.29% White, 1.76% Native American, 0.14% Asian, and 0.81% from two or more races. Hispanic or Latino of any race were 0.81% of the population.

There were 345 households, out of which 21.2% had children under the age of 18 living with them, 47.0% were married couples living together, 7.2% had a female householder with no husband present, and 40.0% were non-families. 36.2% of all households were made up of individuals, and 23.8% had someone living alone who was 65 years of age or older. The average household size was 2.14 and the average family size was 2.79.

In the city, the population was spread out, with 20.7% under the age of 18, 5.7% from 18 to 24, 23.3% from 25 to 44, 20.1% from 45 to 64, and 30.2% who were 65 years of age or older. The median age was 45 years. For every 100 females, there were 97.9 males. For every 100 females age 18 and over, there were 97.0 males.

The median income for a household in the city was $25,887, and the median income for a family was $29,464. Males had a median income of $25,000 versus $16,818 for females. The per capita income for the city was $14,303. About 8.8% of families and 13.7% of the population were below the poverty line, including 19.5% of those under age 18 and 8.0% of those age 65 or over.

Climate
This climatic region is typified by large seasonal temperature differences, with warm to hot (and often humid) summers and cold (sometimes severely cold) winters.  According to the Köppen Climate Classification system, Lidgerwood has a humid continental climate, abbreviated "Dfb" on climate maps.

References

External links
 Lidgerwood, North Dakota: community fact survey (1965) from the Digital Horizons website

Cities in North Dakota
Cities in Richland County, North Dakota
Populated places established in 1886
Wahpeton micropolitan area
1886 establishments in Dakota Territory